Mathieu Lacombe is a Canadian politician, who was elected to the National Assembly of Quebec in the 2018 provincial election. He represents the electoral district of Papineau as a member of the Coalition Avenir Québec and was the former Minister of Families.

Prior to his election in the National Assembly, he was the spokesperson for the Société de transport de l'Outaouais, and before that he was a television news anchor for TVA Nouvelles on TVA affiliate CHOT-DT.

References

Living people
Coalition Avenir Québec MNAs
21st-century Canadian politicians
Canadian television news anchors
Members of the Executive Council of Quebec
Politicians from Gatineau
Year of birth missing (living people)